Rizoneide Vanderlei, surname also referenced as Wanderlei or Wanderley, (born December 16, 1966) is a former Brazilian long-distance runner.  Vanderlei competed in the 1997 IAAF World Cross Country Championships, 1995 IAAF World Half Marathon Championships, and the 1995 IAAF World Half Marathon Championships.

Vanderlei won the 1996 California International Marathon (2:35:46), and the 2000 Rio de Janeiro Marathon (2:43:53).

Achievements

References

External links
 July 20, 2000 interview.

1966 births
Living people
Brazilian female long-distance runners
Brazilian female marathon runners
20th-century Brazilian women
21st-century Brazilian women